Franck Allisio (born 4 August 1980) is a French politician who has represented the 12th constituency of the Bouches-du-Rhône department in the National Assembly since 2022. He is a member of the National Rally (RN).

Biography 
Franck Allisio was born in Marseille. After his law and political science studies, he worked in Roger Karoutchi's cabinet as press relations manager before joining Nathalie Kosciusko-Morizet's cabinet. In 2012, he became an assistant to MP Pierre Lellouche.

National president of the "Jeunes actifs" movement of The Republicans, he announced on 13 September 2015 in Marseille that he would join the National Front (later National Rally).

He was appointed spokesperson for Marion Maréchal-Le Pen's regional campaign in Provence-Alpes-Côte d'Azur later in 2015. He was elected to the Regional Council of Provence-Alpes-Côte d'Azur for Bouches-du-Rhône.

In 2017, Allisio ran for the National Assembly and obtained just under 20% of the vote in the first round in the 1st constituency of Bouches-du-Rhône in Marseille. In 2020, he was elected a municipal councillor of Marseille in the 6th sector (11th and 12th arrondissements).

Ahead of the 2022 presidential election, Allisio was part of Marine Le Pen's campaign team. In the 2022 legislative election, he ran again for the National Assembly, this time in the 12th constituency of Bouches-du-Rhône, which comprises the Marseille northwestern suburbs of Marignane and Vitrolles. Allisio, the party leader in Bouches-du-Rhône, defeated incumbent The Republicans MP Éric Diard with 51.3% of the vote.

In Parliament, he sits on the Finance Committee.

Publication
 L'Union Européenne est morte. Vive l'Europe !

References

External links

 
 

1980 births
Living people
Union for a Popular Movement politicians
The Republicans (France) politicians
National Rally (France) politicians
Politicians from Marseille
French people of Italian descent
Aix-Marseille University alumni
Paris 2 Panthéon-Assas University alumni
Members of the Regional Council of Provence-Alpes-Côte d'Azur
Deputies of the 16th National Assembly of the French Fifth Republic
Members of Parliament for Bouches-du-Rhône
French city councillors